Turbonilla cbadamsi is a species of sea snail, a marine gastropod mollusk in the family Pyramidellidae, the pyrams and their allies.

References

External links
 To World Register of Marine Species

cbadamsi
Gastropods described in 1857